Wyndham Springfield City Centre is the tallest skyscraper in Springfield, Illinois. It was the tallest Hilton Hotel in the state of Illinois as well.

The hotel opened in 1974 as the Forum 30 Plaza Hotel. It was renamed the Hilton Towers in 1980, later becoming the Springfield Hilton and then the Hilton Springfield in 1998. The hotel converted from Hilton to Wyndham on December 31, 2015.

The lower 15 floors are accessed by glass elevators with city views, while the upper 15 floors are accessed by ordinary interior elevators. The only exceptions to this system are that all elevators serve the basement (C), lobby/ground floor (M), 29th floor, and 30th floor. The building's lobby has a small waterfall and garden feature similar to the Westin Peachtree in Atlanta, GA, but on a smaller scale. Floor 30 has multiple panoramic, high-end restaurants and bars. It has a parking garage owned by the City of Springfield, connected to the tower by an underground concourse and a skybridge. It has the unique distinction of being one of only 2 chain hotels in downtown Springfield, the other being a Hilton DoubleTree, a rare number of hotels in a city center for a city of its size.

Hotel levels

C | Concourse Level
 
Contains an indoor pool, fitness center, and meeting rooms.
 
L | Ground/Lobby Level
 
Contains hotel lobby, shops, and meeting rooms.
 
M | Main Level
 
Contains meeting rooms and connection to parking garage.
 
2-28 | Guestroom Levels
 
29 | Vista Level
 
Contains Vista Rooms meeting rooms with panoramic views. Can be reached by non-emergency stairs from level 30. Also contains restrooms for restaurants on level 30.
 
30 | Penthouse Level
 
Contains 2 separate restaurants with panoramic views.

References

Emporis buildings data
Official site

External links

Hotel buildings completed in 1974
1970s architecture in the United States
Hotels established in 1974
Buildings and structures in Springfield, Illinois
Hilton Hotels & Resorts hotels
Skyscraper hotels in Illinois
Wyndham Destinations
1974 establishments in Illinois